Arikunte is a Gram panchayat village in Srinivasapura Taluk, Kolar district in the state of Karnataka, India.

Cities and towns in Kolar district